This is a list of the NCAA indoor champions in a long sprint relay event.  Generally that was the Mile (4x440 yard) relay until 1983, and the 4x400 meters relay being contested thereafter.  The track in 1986 and 1987 did not conform to specifications.  Hand timing was used until 1975 and in 1980, starting in 1976 fully automatic timing was used.

Champions
Key
y=yards
w=wind aided
A=Altitude assisted

4x440 yards relay

4x400 meters relay

References

GBR Athletics

External links
NCAA Division I men's indoor track and field

NCAA Men's Division I Indoor Track and Field Championships
Indoor track, men